Archiearis infans, the infant, is a moth of the family Geometridae. The species was first described by Heinrich Benno Möschler in 1862. It is found from Alaska to Newfoundland and the northern United States, south in the east to New Jersey, south in the west to California.

Subspecies
Archiearis infans infans
Archiearis infans oregonensis (Swett, 1917) (southern British Columbia to California)

External links

Archiearinae
Moths described in 1862
Moths of North America
Taxa named by Heinrich Benno Möschler